Barrio Belgrano may refer to at least two neighbourhoods in Argentine cities:

 Barrio Belgrano, Rosario
 Belgrano, Buenos Aires